The 2002 Grote Prijs Jef Scherens was the 36th edition of the Grote Prijs Jef Scherens cycle race and was held on 1 September 2002. The race started and finished in Leuven. The race was won by Andreas Klier.

General classification

References

2002
2002 in road cycling
2002 in Belgian sport